Shahrak-e Shahid Kallah Duz (also Romanized as Shahrak-e Shahīd Kallāh Dūz) is a village in Bampur-e Sharqi Rural District, in the Central District of Bampur County, Sistan and Baluchestan Province, Iran. At the 2006 census, its population was 625, in 133 families.

References 

Populated places in Bampur County